Jevan Maseko (January 1, 1943 – May 20, 2013) was a Zimbabwean military officer, the Governor of the Matabeleland North Province, and the Ambassador to Algeria, Russia and Cuba.

Death
Maseko died of diabetes and a kidney failure on May 20, 2013.

References

1943 births
2013 deaths
Zimbabwean politicians